VDL Nedcar is an automotive manufacturing company in Born, Netherlands. Since December 2012 it has been owned by the Dutch industrial conglomerate VDL Groep. Previous owners were Mitsubishi Motors and Volvo Cars. The company had its origins in a DAF car factory which opened in 1968. VDL Nedcar is the largest automotive factory in the Netherlands, with a production capacity of 240,000 vehicles a year. It produced about 120,000 cars in 2020. It is also the only manufacturer of production vehicles in the Netherlands. VDL Nedcar produced its millionth vehicle, a Mitsubishi Space Star, on 4 October 2000. 
VDL Nedcar currently produces the Mini Cabrio convertible, Mini Countryman, Mini Countryman-PHEV and BMW X1 for BMW Group.

Location

VDL Nedcar in Born is located in Limburg, a province in the south of the Netherlands. VDL Nedcar has direct access to the ports of Rotterdam, Zeebrugge, Antwerp and Hamburg. Nearby is an inland barge terminal and a rail terminal, supported by airports such as Maastricht/Aachen, Amsterdam, Eindhoven, Brussels, Cologne and Düsseldorf.

Area development and expansion of VDL Nedcar

In 2019, VDL Nedcar and the province of Limburg signed an agreement on the sale of land around the factory, increasing the total site to about 1,500,000 square meters. Permits are expected to be granted in late 2021 for another expansion of 59 hectares, allowing up to 400,000 vehicles a year to be produced.

History
The factory was founded in 1967 by the former Van Doorne's Automobiel Fabriek (DAF), and continued after the takeover of its parent by Volvo in 1972–1975. When financial difficulties threatened to close it down in the early 1990s the government stepped in to ensure its survival.

A joint venture between the Dutch State, Volvo and Mitsubishi Motors began in August 1991, although it was 1996 before the name was officially changed from Volvo Car B.V. to Netherlands Car B.V. On 15 February 1999 the Dutch government sold its shares to its two partners, which then owned 50 percent each. Later, on 30 March 2001, Volvo sold its shares to Mitsubishi, which then owned 100 percent. The plant's long-term survival was in question from 2001, when then Mitsubishi Motors Chief Operating Officer Rolf Eckrodt stated that its annual vehicle production capacity had to increase to 280,000 if it wished to remain economically viable. The last Volvo automobiles were built in 2004.

Between 2004 and 2012 the Mitsubishi Colt was built at Nedcar. The factory also produced the Colt's sister vehicle, the Smart Forfour, for DaimlerChrysler until production ceased in mid-2006. Industrial action was taken in 2005 in protest against the discontinuation of the Smart Forfour, although Mitsubishi confirmed its commitment to keeping the factory open as far as the end of the Colt's life cycle in 2009. Since then, European market versions of the Mitsubishi Outlander have had their production transferred from Japan to the Netherlands from 2008, while the Outlander-based Citroën C-Crosser and Peugeot 4007 were also planned to be assembled at Born for the European market, but this was postponed indefinitely because of slow sales of these models. Labour union FNV, NedCar COO Joost Goovaarts and the works council have said it is a step towards securing the future of the plant.

In 2012, Mitsubishi announced it would stop producing cars in the Netherlands.

Dutch industrial group VDL acquired the factory in December 2012 and renamed it VDL Nedcar. VDL entered negotiations with BMW which resulted in the announcement that certain Mini models would be produced in the Limburg factory from 2014 onwards.

Since 2017, the BMW X1 (F48) has been produced at VDL Nedcar, which shares production with the BMW Group plant at Regensburg.

In October 2020, VDL Nedcar announced that it would not receive a follow-up order for the Mini Countryman from BMW Group for the longer term, leaving it to search for another manufacturer to fill production capacity.

In June 2021, U.S. EV startup Canoo announced it would use VDL for its first run of the Lifestyle Vehicle starting in 2022, an interim measure as it builds its Oklahoma factory.

Production
After the cessation of Mitsubishi manufacturing in 2012, production restarted in 2014 with the new Mini Hatch model.

Current production
Mini Hatch (2014–2017)
Mini Convertible (2015–present), only plant that assembles the Mini Convertible
Mini Countryman (2016–present)
BMW X1 (F48) (2017–2022)

Past models and production years

 DAF 33 (1967–1972)
 DAF 44 (1967–1975)
 DAF 55 (1968–1972)
 DAF 66 (1972–1975)
 DAF 46 (1975–1976)
 Volvo 66 (1975–1981)
 Volvo 340/360 (1976–1991)
 Volvo 480 (1986–1995)
 Volvo 440/460 (1987–1997)
 Volvo S40/V40 (1995–2004)
 Mitsubishi Carisma (1995–2004)
 Mitsubishi Space Star (1998–2005)
 Smart Forfour (2004–2006)
 Mitsubishi Colt (2004–2012)
 Mitsubishi Outlander (2008–2012)

Annual output

In 2011, the Nedcar factory produced 4.3% of the global output of Mitsubishi. However, vehicle assembly for Mitsubishi came to an end during 2012.

NedCar Access
NedCar displayed the Access concept car at the 1996 Geneva Motor Show to demonstrate the company's product design and engineering capabilities. It was constructed with a mix of aluminium and plastics.

References

External links

NedCar
Nedcar at Linkedin

 
Car manufacturers of the Netherlands
Motor vehicle assembly plants in the Netherlands
Vehicle manufacturing companies established in 1967
VDL Nedcar
VDL Nedcar
VDL Nedcar
Contract vehicle manufacturers
Dutch companies established in 1967